Ghannouchi is a Tunisian surname. Notable people with the surname include:

Mohamed Ghannouchi (born 1941), former Prime Minister of Tunisia
Rached Ghannouchi (born 1941), Tunisian politician and thinker

Arabic-language surnames
Surnames of Tunisian origin